Nelson v. Colorado, 581 U.S. ___ (2017), is a decision by the Supreme Court of the United States. In a 7-1 decision written by Justice Ruth Bader Ginsburg, the Court held that a state had no right to keep fines and other money based on an invalid conviction. Justice Samuel Alito wrote an opinion concurring in the judgment, Justice Clarence Thomas wrote a dissenting opinion, and Justice Neil Gorsuch did not take part in the consideration or decision of the case.

Background
The case combined lawsuits by two petitioners: Shannon Nelson and Louis Madden. Nelson was convicted of child abuse and sentenced to 20 years to life, and assessed $8,192 in various fees and restitution. Madden was convicted of attempting to patronize a prostituted child and attempted sexual assault, and received an indeterminate sentence and had to pay $4,413. Both convictions were overturned on appeal and the petitioners were considered factually innocent.

Colorado's Exoneration Act requires that a person who is exonerated after being convicted must petition a Colorado District Court for an order entitling them to receive compensation.

On January 9, 2017, oral arguments were heard, where Professor Stuart Banner appeared for the accused, and the Colorado Solicitor General appeared for that state.

Opinion of the Court
On April 19, 2017, the Supreme Court delivered judgment in favor of the accused, voting 7-1 to reverse and remand to the state court.  Justice Ruth Bader Ginsburg wrote the opinion of the Court, joined by Chief Justice John Roberts, Justice Kennedy Anthony Kennedy and Stephen Breyer, Sonia Sotomayor, and Elena Kagan.  This decision held that the part of the law regarding "any fine, penalty, court costs, or restitution imposed upon and paid by the wrongfully convicted person" violated the Fourteenth Amendment's guarantee of due process. The petitioners are entitled to prompt repayment of the money that they paid in regard to the wrongful conviction.

Justice Samuel Alito concurred only in the judgment.

Justice Clarence Thomas dissented.

References

External links
 

United States Supreme Court cases
United States Supreme Court cases of the Roberts Court
2017 in United States case law